The Ukrainian National Committee was a Ukrainian political structure created under the leadership of Pavlo Shandruk, on March 17 (or March 12), 1945 in Weimar, Nazi Germany, nearly two months before the German Instrument of Surrender, with the intention to release Ukrainian Nazi-sponsored military units from the German command. After a series of negotiations, the authorities of the Third Reich officially acknowledged their recognition of the Committee as the sole representative of Ukraine and Ukrainian nation, with the extraterritorial rights and the right to command the Ukrainian National Army under Ukrainian flag and national symbols.

Alfred Rosenberg was one of the initiators of creating the Committee. On 23 February 1945 Rosenberg formally empowered Shandruk to head it. On 12 March 1945 he promulgated the official act of recognition of the Committee:

UNC became the representative organization of Ukrainian life in the Third Reich and the political center of Ukrainian collaboration. UNC consisted of territorial representations centered around an "émigré key:" Semenenko represented Dnieper Ukrainians and émigrés, Shandruk represented the old "Petliurite" émigrés, while the two fractions of Organization of Ukrainian Nationalists, OUN-B and OUN-M, agreed to consider Kubijovyč representing Galician Ukrainians. He also represented the émigrés in the Third Reich. UNC was supported by both leaders of OUN, Stepan Bandera and Andriy Melnyk, although Melnyk remained cautious about the idea of "the last crusade against the USSR", while Bandera argued for "full support to the end, whatever it may be." However, the Committee received relatively small support from OUN, as the "Melnykites" didn't have a political monopoly over UNC and tried to "maintain a clean moral slate", while Bandera already had the Ukrainian Supreme Liberation Council, which was also was oriented for cooperation with the United States and Britain and conveyed a "democratic" image.

One of the main goals of creating UNC was to present the Ukrainian collaborationism as a legal, legitimate ally to Germany, and a political power which never renounced the struggle for an independent, nationalist Ukrainian state. After creating the Committee and turning the Galizien division into the First Division of the Ukrainian National Army, the collaborators claimed that neither the division nor the National Committee cooperated with the Nazis but were independent Ukrainian formations with the goals of combating the Soviet Union and making contact with the Western Allies. On March 15, Andriy Livytskyi, the President of the Ukrainian People's Republic in exile, officially recognized Shandruk and the future National Army he would command as the Armed Forces of UPR in exile. However, the Galizien division remained under tactical control of Nazi Germany until the final surrender.

Other goals were to create a strong Ukrainian émigré base by gaining new supporters from the evacuees and Ukrainian laborers in the Third Reich by providing welfare and aid over them and preventing their return to Soviet Ukraine; to prevent weakening and decreasing
the OUN while strengthening a non-OUN nationalist movement; to make sure Ukrainians remaining in Germany would not be treated by a future German government as Nazi collaborators or stateless people who could be simply evicted by getting involved in the impending Cold War.

Notes

Further reading
 John Alexander Armstrong Ukrainian nationalism Ed. 3, Englewood, Colorado, U.S.A. : Ukrainian Academic Press, 1990. ; 
 Nicholas Bethell, The Last Secret. Forcible Repatriation to Russia 1944- 1947, London 1974 
 
  Pavlo Shandruk, Historyczna prawda o Ukraińskiej Armii Narodowej, Kultura, nr 6, Paris, 1965
 Pavlo Shandruk, Arms of Valor, Robert Speller & Sons Publishers, Inc., New York 1959
 Nikolai Tolstoy, Victims of Yalta, originally published in London, 1977. Revised edition 1979.

See also 
 National Committee of Azerbaijan

Politics of Ukraine
1945 establishments in Germany
1945 disestablishments in Europe
Anti-communist organizations
Ukrainian collaborators with Nazi Germany
Organization of Ukrainian Nationalists